The Basílica del Salvador is a basilica located at the corner of Huérfanos Street and Almirante Barroso Street in the Barrio Brasil of Santiago de Chile. The basilica was designed by the German architect Teodoro Burchard in the Neo Gothic style.  It was renovated by Josué Smith Solar in 1932.
 
Two earthquakes, one in 1985 and the other in 2010, badly damaged the basilica.

References

External links

Churches in Santiago, Chile
Roman Catholic churches in Chile
Basilica churches in Chile
Gothic Revival church buildings in Chile